This is a list of the 24 members of the European Parliament for Portugal in the 1989 to 1994 session.

List

See also
 1989 European Parliament election in Portugal

Portugal
 *List
1989